Ashyiane Forum or Ashiyane Digital Security team was a hacker forum in Iran, founded by Behrooz Kamalian in 2002. It had direct ties to Iran's Islamic Revolutionary Guards Corps. The forum was shutdown in 2018. and now 2021 back to cyberspace.

Notes 

Internet in Iran